Chief Minister of Gilgit Baltistan is elected by the Gilgit Baltistan Assembly to serve as the head of the provincial government in Gilgit-Baltistan for a five-year term. The current Chief Minister is Khalid Khurshid, who was elected on 1 December 2020, following the 2020 Gilgit-Baltistan Assembly election.

List of Chief Ministers

Timeline

See also
 Government of Gilgit-Baltistan
 Cabinet of Gilgit-Baltistan
 Gilgit-Baltistan Assembly
 Governor of Gilgit-Baltistan
 List of Chief Ministers in Pakistan
 List of Governors of Pakistan

References

External links
 Chief Minister's Website
 Government of Gilgit-Baltistan
 Gilgit-Baltistan Assembly Website

Gilgit-Baltistan